Ayer Fue Kumbia Kings, Hoy Es Kumbia All Starz (English: Yesterday Was Kumbia Kings, Today Is Kumbia All Starz) is the debut studio album by Mexican-American cumbia group A.B. Quintanilla y Los Kumbia All Starz and the fifth studio album by Mexican-American musician A.B. Quintanilla. It was released on October 3, 2006 by EMI Latin. The fan edition was released on October 2, 2007. It has all the songs from the standard edition plus two more tracks and the music videos for "Chiquilla", "Parece Que Va a Llover", and "Speedy Gonzales".

Track listing

Notes
 "Anoche No Dormí" is a Spanish-language cover of "Another Sleepless Night", a 1959 song written by Howard Greenfield and Neil Sedaka, recorded by Sedaka, and recorded and released as a single by Jimmy Clanton in 1960
 "Mamacita Dónde Está Santa Claus" first appeared on Navidad con Amigos 2006, released on December 1, 2006 and re-released on Navidad con Amigos 2007 on November 30, 2007. The music video was released on the Navidad con Amigos DVD on September 18, 2007.

Personnel

Kumbia All Starz
 A.B. Quintanilla III – bass guitar, backing vocals, composer, producer
 Pee Wee – vocals
 Ricky Rick – vocals
 Roque Morales – vocals
 Memo Morales – vocals
 Chris Pérez – guitar
 Nick Banda – keyboards
 Joey Jiménez – drums
 Robert "BoBBo" Gomez III – keyboards
 Noe "Gipper / El Animal" Nieto, Jr. – accordion
 Luigi Giraldo – keyboards, producer

Additional musicians
 Animal – accordion
 Marcello Azevedo – guitar, percussion, programming, vocals, producer, bass
 Alberto Barros – trombone, arranger, producer
 Veve Calasans – percussion, vocals
 Manuel Calderón – A&R
 John DiPuccio – violin
 Robert "LB" Dorsey – mixing
 Sayyd Droullard – assistant
 Rafael Elvira – violin
 Scott Flavin – violin
 Orlando J. Forte – violin
 Javier Garza – mixing
 Sergio George – piano, arranger, producer, mixing
 Luigi Giraldo – arranger, engineer, keyboard programming, A&R, vocal director
 Chris Glansdorp – cello
 Henry Gomez – vihuela
 Robert "Bobbo" Gomez III – arranger, engineer, keyboard programming
 Douglas Guevara – percussion
 Kiddo – DJ
 Dina Kostic – violin
 Isaias Leckler – Bass
 Juan Cristobal Losada – engineer
 Federico Mendez – guitar
 José Antonio Molina – arranger, string direction
 Roque Morales – chorus
 John Mydrycs – mixing
 Chris Pérez – guitar
 Aquiles Priester – percussion
 Joe Reyes – guitar
 Silvio Richetto – vocals, engineer
 Reuben Rodriguez – bass
 Guillermo Sanchez – percussion, guira
 Arturo Sandoval – trumpet
 Tony Seepersad – violin
 SP & JKey – producer
 Dante Vargas – trumpet
 Robert Vilera – percussion
 Orlando Vitto – studio assistant
 Mariusz Wojtowica – violin

Charts

References

2006 debut albums
Kumbia All Starz albums
A. B. Quintanilla albums
Albums produced by A.B. Quintanilla
EMI Latin albums
Spanish-language albums
Cumbia albums
Albums recorded at Q-Productions